Im Namen der Liebe is a studio album by German singer Marianne Rosenberg. It was released by Telamo Musik on 13 March 2020 in German-speaking Europe. The album debuted and peaked at number one on the German Albums Chart, becoming Rosenberg's first album to do so.

Track listing
All tracks produced by Alex Wende.

Charts

Weekly charts

Year-end charts

Release history

References

2020 albums